Zhang Yongze (born March 1969) is a former Chinese politician who spent his entire career in southwest China's Tibet Autonomous Region. He was investigated by China's top anti-graft agency in January 2022. Previously he served as vice chairman of Tibet Autonomous Region and before that, mayor and party secretary of Shannan.

Biography
Zhang was born in Qiubei County, Yunnan, in March 1969. In 1987, he was admitted to Chengdu University of Science and Technology, majoring in terrestrial hydrology. He began graduate work at Chengdu University of Science and Technology in 1991 and then Sichuan Union University in 1994. After graduating in 1997, he was assigned to the Chinese Research Academy of Environmental Sciences.

Zhang joined the Chinese Communist Party (CCP) in March 1997, and got involved in politics in June 1998, when he was appointed deputy director of Environmental Protection Bureau of Tibet Autonomous Region, nd five years later promoted to the director position. He became mayor of Shannan, in April 2012, and then party secretary, the top political position in the city, beginning in June 2015. In May 2017, he took office as vice chairman of Tibet Autonomous Region, succeeding .

Downfall
On 8 January 2022, Zhang has been placed under investigation for "serious violations of discipline and laws" by the Central Commission for Discipline Inspection (CCDI), the party's internal disciplinary body, and the National Supervisory Commission, the highest anti-corruption agency of China. On July 7, he was expelled from the CCP and removed from public office.

References

1969 births
Living people
People from Qiubei County
Sichuan University alumni
People's Republic of China politicians from Yunnan
Chinese Communist Party politicians from Yunnan